Stefania Zahorska (25 April 1890 – 6 April 1961), pseudonym Pandora, was a Polish art historian.

Zahorska was born in Kraków. In the years 1924–1925, she was director of the art section of Przegląd Warszawski. She was the permanent collaborator of Wiadomości literackie, docent of Wolna Wszechnica Polska in Warsaw, and co-founder of the Polish Writers Association Ltd in London. She lived in France from 1939 to 1940, when she moved to the UK. She died in London.

Zahorska was an author of works Matejko (1925), Eugeniusz Żak (1927), Szczęśliwe oczy. Wybór studiów i esejów z dziedziny filozofii, historii i krytyki sztuk plastycznych z lat 1921-1960 (published posthumously in London, 1970), novels Stacja Abbesses (Tonbridge, 1952), Ziemia pojona gniewem (London, 1961), Ofiara, memoirs Warszawa - Lwów 1939 (London, 1964).
She became the partner and literary collaborator of the Polish exiled activist and writer, Adam Pragier.

References

1890 births
1961 deaths
Polish art historians
Polish women novelists
20th-century Polish novelists
Women art historians
20th-century Polish women writers